is a Japanese field hockey player. At the 2012 Summer Olympics she competed with the Japan women's national field hockey team in the women's tournament.

References

External links
 

Living people
1987 births
Field hockey players at the 2012 Summer Olympics
Olympic field hockey players of Japan
Japanese female field hockey players
Asian Games medalists in field hockey
Field hockey players at the 2010 Asian Games
Field hockey players at the 2014 Asian Games
Sportspeople from Gifu Prefecture
Asian Games bronze medalists for Japan
Medalists at the 2010 Asian Games